The Main road 222 is a short south–north direction Secondary class main road in Balassagyarmat, that connects the Main road 22 change to the border of Slovakia.

The road, as well as all other main roads in Hungary, is managed and maintained by Magyar Közút, state owned company.

See also

 Roads in Hungary

Sources

External links

 Hungarian Public Road Non-Profit Ltd. (Magyar Közút Nonprofit Zrt.)
 National Infrastructure Developer Ltd.

Main roads in Hungary
Nógrád County